The Wrede Range is a small subrange of the Swannell Ranges of the Omineca Mountains, located between Ingenika River and Wrede Creek in northern British Columbia, Canada.

References

Wrede Range in the Canadian Mountain Encyclopedia

Swannell Ranges